"Muscle Museum" is a song by the English rock band Muse, released as the third single from their 1999 debut album Showbiz.

Content 

The title likely derives from the fact that the words "muscle" and "museum" come immediately before and after the word "muse" in some dictionaries.

Music video

The music video is directed by Joseph Kahn and features different people in a suburban neighbourhood, crying in different situations, as Muse plays in a high school after a party, as a janitor cleans up. As the video goes on, some of the townspeople attempt suicide, and by the end of the video, the janitor breaks down. Joseph Kahn wanted to express the "sadness" of life in the suburbs where every house looks more or less the same. Individual expression is not possible because of the surroundings and the rules in those suburbs, happiness (or pretending to be happy) is mandatory.

Though Joseph Kahn himself thinks of the video as one of the best he made, he believes that most people, including Muse, don't like the video.

Release 

"Muscle Museum" was released on 22 November 1999 on 7" vinyl—backed with "Minimum"—and double CD—backed with "Do We Need This?", a live acoustic version of the song, "Pink Ego Box" and "Con-Science". It reached #43 in the UK Singles Chart—an improvement of nine positions on "Cave".

The song is available to play on Rocksmith 2014 as part of a Muse 5-song pack.

Live performances 
"Muscle Museum" was a staple in the band's live performances from 1997 until 2004. The song made occasional appearances on the Black Holes and Revelations Tour, and later, the Psycho Tour and Drones World Tour.

Track listing

Re-release

A "US Mix" of "Muscle Museum" was released on 9 October 2000 on 7" vinyl—backed with a live version of "Escape"—and double CD—backed with a live version of "Agitated", the 'Timo Maas Sunstroke Remix' of "Sunburn", the 'Saint US Mix' of "Sober" and the 'Soulwax Remix' of the song. It reached number 25 in the UK Singles Chart—eighteen positions higher than its original release.

Release history

References

External links 

 

Muse (band) songs
1999 singles
Music videos directed by Joseph Kahn
Songs written by Matt Bellamy
1999 songs
Mushroom Records singles
Rock ballads